The Stealing of Northern State Treasury was the theft of approximately  from the Albanian treasury in Shkodër in 1997 (equivalent to about US$million in ).

The event
The incident happened in March 1997 during the Albanian Civil War, when a group of six people attacked the fortified building of the State Treasury with an antitank weapon. The total amount of money that was inside the building was US$8million, but the robbers only managed to acquire US$6million. The few police still in the city soon arrived at the scene and took control of the remaining assets. Later, the thieves were seen by several witnesses meeting at the outskirts of Shkodër, where they divided the money between themselves.

Investigations
After the robbery, the police and investigators began investigations in Shkodër. In the spring of 1998, more than a year later, the investigators closed the file and it was given to the police for further investigation. The perpetrators of this crime are still unknown to this day.

References

Albanian Civil War
1997 in Albania
March 1997 events in Europe